Toomorrow is a 1970 British science fiction musical film directed by Val Guest and starring Olivia Newton-John.

Synopsis
A group of students pay their way through school by forming a pop band called Toomorrow; sonic vibrations from a special instrument called a "tonaliser" cause an extraterrestrial to abduct the group, and have them entertain the Alphoid population.

Cast

Production
James Bond film producer Harry Saltzman entered into a three-picture deal with Don Kirshner. Kirshner had been the initial producer of the musical output from the Monkees. However, according to director Val Guest, Kirshner and Saltzman grew to loathe each other during the increasingly troubled production.

Saltzman hired novelist David Benedictus to write the first draft, but after 30 pages neither Saltzman nor Guest felt it was working. Guest conceded that it was "very well written, but a little bit too 'high-faluting'". Saltzman advised Guest to write a new script. However, unbeknownst to Guest, Saltzman never informed Benedictus. Only during production did Benedictus learn that a new script had been commissioned.

Guest had been working on the film for six months beyond the time specified for in his contract and still hadn't been paid, nor had anyone else who worked on the film. Saltzman didn't have the money nor did his company "Sweet Music" which was in Switzerland. Guest waited until after the film's premiere at the London Pavilion to obtain an injunction. The film could not be shown until Guest and the other people who worked on the film were paid. According to Guest in 1994, he still had not been paid and the injunction was still in effect.

As a result, the film, which took about two years to make, was shown (in the London Pavilion, then a cinema) for only one week, then was shelved. Aside from isolated showings in the British forces cinemas during 1971 and early 1972 on British military bases, and one showing in Los Angeles in 2000 (see below), Toomorrow was not seen in public for over four decades.

YouTube has the restored film available for entertainment purposes.

Response
In a March 1971 edition of the British music magazine, NME, Newton-John commented "Our film died a death and it was all a bit of a shambles. But it was a good experience".

According to onlyolivia.com:

Don Kirshner died in January 2011, and in March 2012 the movie was released on DVD in the UK by Pickwick having licensed the film from the estate of writer and director Val Guest.  Unfortunately, the DVD release was of low quality:  It was sourced from an inferior video element and the audio is of marginal quality, and they failed to make it dual-mono:  The sound only comes out of one stereo speaker.

See also
 Toomorrow (soundtrack)

References

External links
 
 
 Toomorrow movie recap at the Agony Booth

1970 films
1970s musical films
British musical films
British science fiction films
1970s science fiction films
Science fiction musical films
1970s English-language films
Films directed by Val Guest
Films scored by Hugo Montenegro
Films shot at Pinewood Studios
Films produced by Harry Saltzman
Films set in London
1970s British films